Three water towers in Września once supplied water in Września, Poland. Two water towers are still in use.

Tower on the premises of the water treatment plant 

The tallest was built in 1904 (some sources say 1907 and 1911) and is the highest building in the vicinity. The building belongs to the municipal Water Supply and Sewerage Enterprise. Next to the water tower stands the water treatment plant. The tower is near two ponds, allotment gardens and Polytechnic School.

Tower on the railroad station 

Another tower, built in 1907 and now unused, is located at the Września railway station, near several apartment buildings and an overpass. Another, smaller tower has been destroyed during the bombing on 5 October 1939.

Extinct tower in the barracks compound 

A former tower was located in the prussian Barracks Complex in Września. It did not survive the Russian invasion. The location houses a cinema, a club and Wielkopolska Insurgents’ Trade School No 2.

References 

Water towers in Poland
Września